Aytaj Sharifova (born 8 January 1997) is an Azerbaijani footballer, who plays as a goalkeeper for the Turkish Women's Super League club Trabzonspor, and captains the Azerbaijan women's national team.

Club career 
In the beginning of 2020, Sharifova moved to Turkey and joined Hakkarigücü Spor in the second half of the 2019-20 Women's First League. She played again for the Turkish team in the 2021-22 Women's Super League. In the |2022–23 Turkish Women's Super League season, she transferred to Trabzonspor.

International career 
Sharifova played for the Azerbaijan national team at two matches of the UEFA Women's Euro 2022 qualifying Group D, six matches of the 2023 FIFA Women's World Cup qualification – UEFA Group E.

Career statistics 
.

See also 
List of Azerbaijan women's international footballers

References

External links 

1997 births
Living people
Women's association football goalkeepers
Azerbaijani women's footballers
Azerbaijan women's international footballers
Azerbaijani expatriate footballers
Azerbaijani expatriates in Iceland
Expatriate women's footballers in Iceland
Keflavík women's football players
Azerbaijani expatriate sportspeople in Turkey
Expatriate women's footballers in Turkey
Úrvalsdeild kvenna (football) players
Turkish Women's Football Super League players
Hakkarigücü Spor players
Trabzonspor women's players